Greene County is a county located in the U.S. state of Illinois. According to the 2020 United States Census, it has a population of 11,843. Its county seat is Carrollton.

A notable archaeological area, the Koster Site, has produced evidence of more than 7,000 years of human habitation. Artifacts from the site are displayed at the Center for American Archeology in Kampsville, Illinois.

History
Greene County is named in honor of General Nathanael Greene, a hero of the American Revolutionary War. In 1821, three years after Illinois became a state, Greene County was established, being carved out of what was previously Madison county and St. Clair county before that. Over the course of the next 18 years four more counties were formed out of what was once Greene Country. These include Scott, Morgan, Macoupin and Jersey counties. This left Greene county with approximately 546 square miles of land located in western-central Illinois near the Illinois River, which was an important resource that provided both a means for travel and to ship goods. Like much of southern Illinois the earliest settlers in the county came from Southern states such as North and South Carolina, Virginia, Kentucky, and Tennessee. By the time of the Civil War, 1860, the population of Greene County had grown to 16,093 and 10% of the adult population had been born in the Northeast, 15% were foreign born, 25% were born in Southern states, and almost 50% had been born in the Midwest. Of the population born in the Midwest many could still trace their roots to the South, with almost 80% of them having a parents born in a Southern state.

Geography

Climate and weather

Major highways

  U.S. Highway 67
  Illinois Route 100
  Illinois Route 108
  Illinois Route 267

Adjacent counties

 Scott County - north
 Morgan County - north
 Macoupin County - east
 Jersey County - south
 Calhoun County - southwest
 Pike County - northwest

National protected area
 Two Rivers National Wildlife Refuge (part: Apple Creek Division)

Demographics

As of the 2010 United States Census, there were 13,886 people, 5,570 households, and 3,777 families living in the county. The racial makeup of the county was 97.9% white, 0.9% black or African American, 0.2% American Indian, 0.1% Asian, 0.3% from other races, and 0.7% from two or more races. Those of Hispanic or Latino origin made up 0.8% of the population. In terms of ancestry, 30.7% were German, 14.7% were Irish, 13.3% were English, and 12.1% were American.

Of the 5,570 households, 30.9% had children under the age of 18 living with them, 53.0% were married couples living together, 9.4% had a female householder with no husband present, 32.2% were non-families, and 27.8% of all households were made up of individuals. The average household size was 2.44 and the average family size was 2.95. The median age was 41.6 years.

The median income for a household in the county was $41,450 and the median income for a family was $52,049. Males had a median income of $38,185 versus $27,231 for females. The per capita income for the county was $22,107. About 11.8% of families and 15.1% of the population were below the poverty line, including 22.1% of those under age 18 and 10.0% of those age 65 or over.

Communities

Cities

 Carrollton
 Greenfield
 Roodhouse
 White Hall

Villages

 Eldred
 Hillview
 Kane
 Rockbridge
 Wilmington

Unincorporated communities

 Barrow
 Belltown
 Drake
 Fayette
 Wrights

Townships

 Athensville
 Bluffdale
 Carrollton
 Kane
 Linder
 Patterson
 Rockbridge
 Roodhouse
 Rubicon
 Walkerville
 White Hall
 Woodville
 Wrights

Population ranking
The population ranking of the following table is based on the 2020 census of Greene County.

† county seat

Politics
Greene County was reliably Democratic from the beginning through 1948; only one Republican Party nominee carried the county vote during that period. Since then it has usually voted for the Republican presidential nominee (14 of 18 elections).

As one of the most northerly “southern” counties in Illinois, Greene County was rock-ribbed Democratic for the seventy years after the Civil War, which it opposed as a “Yankee” war. Not until considerable anti-Catholic sentiment against Al Smith turned many voters to Herbert Hoover did the county support a Republican presidential nominee. However, with the coming of World War II, opposition to American involvement led to gains for Wendell Willkie and Thomas E. Dewey, although apart from the 1960 election – also influenced by Catholicism – Greene was a bellwether county throughout the period from 1928 to 2004.

Hillary Clinton’s 2016 tally of 21.68 percent of the county’s vote is 14.3 percent worse than any Democrat presidential candidate before 2012.

Political culture

See also
 National Register of Historic Places listings in Greene County, Illinois

References

 
Illinois counties
1821 establishments in Illinois
Populated places established in 1821